This article deals with the phonology of the standard Ukrainian language.

Stress 
Stress is phonemic in Ukrainian. With most Ukrainian nouns, the stress falls on either the final vowel of the stem or the initial vowel of the inflection. In a few nouns the stress may be further forward. The position is generally fixed for the various cases of the noun (though inflection stress shifts to the last vowel of the stem if the inflection is a zero suffix), but may change with number (stem stress in both singular and plural, e.g. теа́тр ~ теа́три 'theater'; stem stress in the singular and inflection stress in the plural, e.g. жі́нка ~ жінки́ 'woman'; and so on for all permutations.)

The pattern with adjectives is similar to that of nouns, but does not differ between singular and plural (all stem stress or all inflection stress). In some inflection-stressed adjectives, stress shifts to the stem in the comparative.

With most verbs, stress falls on a syllable in the stem. That syllable may differ between the perfective and imperfective aspects (verbs with 'shifting stress'), but otherwise the stress remains on the same syllable for all inflections. A small group of verbs which do not shift for aspect and have е in their stems bear stress on the inflection. That stress is always on the last syllable of the word apart from in the future imperfective, where it is on the same syllable as in the infinitive (INF нести́, FUT.NPFV.3sg нести́ме 'carry').

With numerals, stress placement may differ between ordinal and cardinal forms.

For names, stress may shift between given names (Богда́н, Рома́н) and family names (Бо́гдан, Ро́ман), and between patronymics (Іва́нович, Богда́нович) and family names (Івано́вич, Богдано́вич).

Vowels 

Ukrainian has the six vowel phonemes shown below.  is a retracted close-mid front vowel .

Ukrainian has no phonemic distinction between long and short vowels; however, unstressed vowels are shorter and tend to be more centralized. The unstressed vowel allophones are as follows:
  remains more or less .
  and  approach , which may be a shared allophone for the two phonemes.

Consonants 

In the table above, whenever two consonants share a cell, the one to the left is voiceless, while the one to the right is voiced.

Phonetic details:
According to some linguists, it is pharyngeal  (when devoiced,  or sometimes  in weak positions). According to others, it is glottal .
For , this only happens after .
It is also vocalized to  before a consonant at the beginning of a word, after a vowel before a consonant or after a vowel at the end of a word. If  occurs before a voiceless consonant and not after a vowel, the voiceless articulation  is also possible.
  is often realized as a single tap .
  are dental , while  are alveolar .
 The group of palatalized consonants consists of 10 phonemes: . All except  have a soft and a hard variant. The labial consonants  only have 'semi-palatalized' versions, and  has only the 'hard' variant. The palatalization of the consonants  is weak; they are usually treated rather as the allophones of the respective hard consonants, not as separate phonemes.
 Unlike Russian and several other Slavic languages, Ukrainian does not have final devoicing for most obstruents, as can be seen, for example, in  "cart", which is pronounced , not .
 The fricative articulations  are voiced allophones of  respectively if they are voiced before other voiced consonants.

Then:

Alternation of vowels and semivowels
The semivowels  and  alternate with the vowels  and  respectively. The semivowels are used in syllable codas: after a vowel and before a consonant, either within a word or between words:

   ('he's coming')
   ('she's coming')
   ('he and she')
   ('she and he');

   ('already gotten tired')
   ('already gotten tired')
   ('He's gotten tired.')
   ('He's inside the house.')
   ('She's inside the house.')
   ('to learn/teach (a little more)')
   ('to have learnt')

This feature distinguishes Ukrainian phonology remarkably from Russian and Polish, two related languages with many cognates.

Consonant assimilation 
Ukrainian has assimilatory voicing: voiceless obstruents are voiced when preceding voiced obstruents. (Voiced sonorants do not trigger voicing.)
   ('our')
   ('our grandfather')
There is no such assimilation in the reverse direction (voicing of voiceless obstruents following voiced obstruents).
   ('birch')
   ('small birch')
With a few exceptions, there is no word-final or assimilatory devoicing in Ukrainian.

Unpalatalized dental consonants  become palatalized if they are followed by other palatalized dental consonants . They are also typically palatalized before the vowel . Historically, contrasting unpalatalized and palatalized articulations of consonants before  were possible and more common, with the absence of palatalization usually reflecting that regular sound changes in the language made an  vowel actually evolve from an older, non-palatalizing  vowel. The absence of consonant palatalization before  has become rare, however, but is still allowed when the і succeeding a consonant originated from older о, evidenced by о preserved in some word forms such as стіл / стола.

While the labial consonants  cannot be phonemically palatalized, they can still precede one of the iotating vowels , when many speakers replace the would-be sequences  with the consonant clusters , a habit also common in nearby Polish. The combinations of labials with iotating vowels are written without the apostrophe after consonants in the same morpheme, e.g. "holiday",  "nail" (but  "union", where  is a prefix), and in some loanwords, e. g. "bureau".

Dental sibilant consonants  become palatalized before any of the labial consonants  followed by one of the iotating vowels , but the labial consonants themselves cannot retain phonemic palatalization.  Thus, words like   "holiday" and   "matchmaker" retain their separate pronunciations (whether or not an actual  is articulated).

Sibilant consonants (including affricates) in clusters assimilate with the place of articulation and palatalization state of the last segment in a cluster. The most common case of such assimilation is the verbal ending  in which  assimilates into .

Dental plosives  assimilate to affricate articulations before coronal affricates or fricatives  and assume the latter consonant's place of articulation and palatalization.

Deviations of spoken language 
There are some typical deviations which may appear in spoken language (often under the influence of Russian). They are usually considered phonetic errors by pedagogists.
  for 
 Final-obstruent devoicing

Historical phonology 

Modern standard Ukrainian descends from Common Slavic and is characterized by a number of sound changes and morphological developments, many of which are shared with other East Slavic languages. These include:

 In a newly closed syllable, that is, a syllable that ends in a consonant, Common Slavic *o and *e mutated into  if the following vowel was one of the yers (*ŭ or *ĭ).
 Pleophony: The Common Slavic combinations, *CoRC and *CeRC, where R is either *r or *l, become in Ukrainian:
 CorC gives CoroC (Common Slavic *borda gives Ukrainian boroda)
 ColC gives ColoC (Common Slavic *bolto gives Ukrainian boloto)
 CerC gives CereC (Common Slavic *berza gives Ukrainian bereza)
 CelC gives ColoC (Common Slavic *melko gives Ukrainian moloko)
Examples: Common Slavic *pętĭ became Ukrainian ; Common Slavic *telę became Ukrainian ; and Common Slavic *kurĭčę became Ukrainian .
 Common Slavic *ě (Cyrillic ѣ), generally became Ukrainian  except:
 word-initially, where it became : Common Slavic *(j)ěsti became Ukrainian  
 after the postalveolar sibilants where it became : Common Slavic *ležěti became Ukrainian 
 Common Slavic *i and *y are both reflected in Ukrainian as 
 The Common Slavic combination -CĭjV, where V is any vowel, became , except:
 if C is labial or  where it became -CjV
 if V is Common Slavic *ĭ, then the combination became , e.g., genitive plural in Common Slavic *myšĭjĭ became Ukrainian 
 if one or more consonants precede C then there is no doubling of the consonants in Ukrainian
 Common Slavic *ǔl and *ĭl became . For example, Common Slavic *vĭlkǔ became  in Ukrainian.

References

Sources

Further reading 

 
 
 
 
 

Phonology
Slavic phonologies